Yoshiaki is a masculine Japanese given name.

Possible writings
Yoshiaki can be written using many different combinations of kanji characters. Here are some examples:

義明, "justice, bright"
義昭, "justice, bright" 
義章, "justice, chapter"
吉明, "good luck, bright"
吉昭, "good luck, bright"
吉旭, "good luck, rising sun"
善明, "virtuous, bright"
善彰, "virtuous, clear"
芳明, "virtuous/fragrant, bright"
芳昭, "virtuous/fragrant, bright"
良明, "good, bright"
良晃, "good, clear"
慶昭, "congratulate, bright"
由晃, "reason, clear"
与志明, "give, determination, bright"
嘉明, "excellent, bright"
嘉秋, "excellent, autumn"

The name can also be written in hiragana よしあき or katakana ヨシアキ.

Notable people with the name
Yoshiaki Ashikaga (足利 義昭, 1537–1597), a shōgun of the Ashikaga shogunate in Japan
 Yoshiaki Arata (荒田 吉明, 1924–2018), a Japanese pioneer of nuclear fusion
 Yoshiaki Banno (番野 欣昭, 1952–1991), a Japanese astronomer 
, Japanese speed skater
 Yoshiaki Fujimori (藤森 義明, born 1951), a Japanese businessman and CEO of Lixil Group
 Yoshiaki Fujioka (藤岡 好明, born 1985), a Japanese baseball player
 Yoshiaki Fujita (藤田 義明, born 1983), a Japanese footballer 
 Yoshiaki Fujiwara (藤原 喜明, born 1949), a Japanese actor and professional wrestler
 Yoshiaki Harada (原田 義昭, born 1944), a Japanese politician 
 Yoshiaki Hatakeda (畠田 好章, born 1972), a Japanese gymnast 
 Yoshiaki Hatta (八田 嘉明, 1879–1964), a cabinet minister in the Empire of Japan
 Yoshiaki Hoshi (星 吉昭, 1946–2004), a Japanese musician 
 Yoshiaki Itakura (板倉 由明, 1932–1999), a Japanese researcher of military history
 Yoshiaki Kato (加藤 嘉明, 1563–1631), a Japanese daimyō 
 Yoshiaki Kawajiri (川尻 善昭, born 1950) a Japanese writer and director of Japanese animation
 Yoshiaki Kawashima (川島 義明, born 1934), a Japanese long-distance runner
, Japanese footballer
 Yoshiaki Kinoshita (木下 淑晶, born 1990), a Japanese football player
 Yoshiaki Koizumi (小泉 歓晃, born 1968), a Japanese video game designer
 Yoshiaki Komai (駒井 善成, born 1992), a Japanese footballer
 Yoshiaki Kuruma (車 吉章, born 1961), a Japanese free announcer
, Japanese ice hockey player
 Yoshiaki Manabe (真鍋 吉明, born 1962), lead guitarist of the Japanese rock band The Pillows
 Yoshiaki Maruyama (丸山 良明, born 1974), a Japanese football player
 Yoshiaki Miyanoue (宮之上 貴昭, born 1953), a Japanese jazz guitarist
 Yoshiaki Mogami (最上 義光, 1546–1614), a Japanese daimyō 
 Yoshiaki Murakami (村上 世彰, born 1959), a Japanese investor 
 Yoshiaki Nishimura (西村 義明, born 1977), a Japanese lead film producer
 Yoshiaki Nitta (新田 義顕, 1318–1337), a general at the fortress of Kanagasaki and son of Yoshisada Nitta
 Yoshiaki Numata (沼田 義明, born 1945), a world Junior Lightweight boxing champion
 Yoshiaki Ochi, (越智 義朗) a Japanese composer and percussionist
 Yoshiaki Ogasawara (小笠原 義明, born 1954), a Japanese cyclist
 Yoshiaki Oiwa (大岩 義明, born 1976), a Japanese equestrian
 Yoshiaki Omura (大村 喜前, 1568–1615) a head of the Omura clan
 Yoshiaki Onishi (大西 義明, born 1981), a Japanese composer and conductor
 Yoshiaki Oshima (大島 良明, born 1952), a Japanese astronomer 
 Yoshiaki Ota (太田 吉彰, born 1983), a Japanese footballer
 Yoshiaki Sato (佐藤 慶明, born 1969), a Japanese football player
 Yoshiaki Shikishi (敷石 義秋, born 1941), a Japanese swimmer
 Yoshiaki Shimojo (下條 佳明, born 1954), a Japanese football player
, Japanese boxer
 Yoshiaki Takaki (高木 義明, born 1945), a Japanese politician
 Yoshiaki Tamura (田村 義顕, ????–1561) was a Japanese daimyō
 Yoshiaki Tokitenku (時天空 慶晃, 1979–2017), a Mongolian sumo wrestler
 Yoshiaki Tsutsumi (堤 義明, born 1934), a Japanese businessman
 Yoshiaki Unetani (采谷 義秋, born 1944), a Japanese long-distance runner
 Yoshiaki Watanabe (渡辺 好明, 1955–2009), a Japanese artist
 Yoshiaki Yatsu (谷津 嘉章, born 1956), a Japanese wrestler
 Yoshiaki Yoshimi (吉見 義明, born 1946), a professor of Japanese modern history

See also
10405 Yoshiaki, an asteroid named after Yoshiaki Mogami
Mogami Yoshiaki Historical Museum, located in the city of Yamagata

Japanese masculine given names